The Alfa Romeo 33 Stradale is a mid-engined sports car built by Italian car manufacturer Alfa Romeo. It is one of the world's first supercars; it was the fastest commercially available car for the standing kilometer when introduced. 18 examples were produced between 1967 and 1969. "Stradale" (Italian for "road-going") is a term often used by Italian car manufacturers to indicate a street-legal version of a racing car; indeed the 33 Stradale was derived from the Tipo 33 sports prototype.

A twin headlight 33 Stradale can be seen in the 1969 Italian movie Un bellissimo novembre.

History
The 33 Stradale, a limited series production car first built in 1967, was based on the Autodelta Alfa Romeo Tipo 33 racing car. The car, designed by Franco Scaglione, and built by Carrozzeria Marazzi, made its debut at the Paris Salon de L'Auto 5 October 1967.

The first prototype (chassis no. 10533.01) was built at Autodelta's workshop in Settimo Milanese, side by side with the Tipo 33 "Periscopica" race car in 1967. The body was built by Franco Scaglione and his men, while Autodelta made the technical production. Another magnesium bodied prototype (chassis no. 10533.12) (planned for some street racing) was started by Scaglione. However, this was not finished until 1968 by Marazzi. The two prototypes are the only ones to have dual headlight arrangement. This was redesigned by Scaglione on the following production cars due to regulations on minimum headlight distance from the ground.

The two prototypes carry the projects original serial numbers, 105.33.xx. However, the Tipo 33 racing- and production Stradales got 750.33.0xx (racing) and 750.33.1xx (stradale) chassis numbers.
Marazzi claims to have built 18 chassis. 5 of them were used for 6 concept cars (one chassis was used twice) by Pininfarina, Bertone and Giugiaro/ItalDesign. Eight are confirmed with Scaglione's beautiful bodies. The rest are experimental or unconfirmed at this point. There are huge holes in the history of the Tipo 33s and the exact number (allegedly 18) of actual Stradale-chassis (with 10 cm longer wheelbase than the race cars) doesn't quite match the range of chassis numbers.

The car was introduced at the Sport Car Show at Monza, Italy in September 1967. The prototype (chassis No. 105.33.01) was sold to private Gallery Abarth, Japan. The second magnesium bodied Stradale prototype (chassis No. 105.33.12) and the five concept cars are now part of the Alfa Romeo Museum.

Specifications

Body and chassis
The 33 Stradale is one of the first production vehicles to feature forward-hinging butterfly doors. The 33 Stradale also features windows which seamlessly curve upward into the 'roof' of the vehicle. The car has aluminium body on aluminium tubular chassis.  As a result of being built by hand, each model differs from the others for some details. For example, the first two cars had twin headlights, replaced for later cars by single headlights. The position of the windscreen wiper, and even the number of them, is another thing that differentiates each example from the others. Also the late models have vents added behind both the front and rear wheels to allow hot air from the brakes to escape.
The car has 13-inch Campagnolo magnesium wheels, the front wheels eight and the rear wheels nine inches wide; the brakes used are disc brakes by Girling, the rear ones are inboard. The suspension system of the car is directly derived from the race cars of the 1960s with upper and lower control arms in front and double trailing arms in the rear, along with substantial antiroll bars.

Engine and transmission
The race-bred engine bore no relation to the mass-produced units in Alfa's more mainstream vehicles. The engine is closely related to the V8 of the Alfa Montreal, albeit with smaller capacity and in a much higher state of tune. Both engines were derived from the 33 racers' but differed in many details. Both engines had chain driven camshafts as opposed to the racers' gear driven ones, but the Stradale kept the racing engine's flat plane crankshaft, whereas the Montreal engine had a crossplane crank. Race engineer Carlo Chiti designed an oversquare bore x stroke of  dry-sump lubricated all-aluminum  V8 engine that featured SPICA fuel injection, four ignition coils and twin spark plugs per cylinder.

As on the racing car, the transmission was a six-speed transaxle made in house by Alfa Romeo.

Although the Stradale is a road car, it has some limitations which may make the everyday use slightly hard, for example missing locks and limited ground clearance.

Performance
It achieved this using an engine less than half the displacement of those in high-performance contemporaries such as the Lamborghini Miura, Ferrari Daytona, and Maserati Ghibli.

Price and value

Built in an attempt by Alfa to make some of its racing technology available to the public, it was the most expensive automobile for sale to the public in 1968 at US$17,000 (when the average cost of a new car in 1968 was $2,822). In the same year, in Italy, the retail price for a 33 Stradale was 9,750,000 lire. In comparison, the Lamborghini Miura was sold for 7,700,000 lire, while the average worker's wage was about 150,000 lire.
The Alfa Romeo 33 Stradale are hardly ever traded; thus their value is very hard to estimate. At the 2015 Detroit auto show, while presenting the Alfa 4C Spider, Alfa's Head of North America estimated the current market value of the 33 Stradale at "well over $10 million".

Concept cars
Five 33 Stradales were used as concept cars with bodies being built by Italian coachbuilders:

Bertone

Alfa Romeo Carabo

Marcello Gandini designed the Carabo, a wedge-shaped coupé with scissor doors, in 1968 for Bertone. The car was built on the chassis No. 750.33.109.

Alfa Romeo Navajo
The Alfa Romeo Navajo concept car was unveiled at the March 1976 Geneva Motor Show. The Navajo is based on the 33 Stradale chassis No. 750.33.11.
It was given a full fibreglass coupé body.

Pininfarina 
Between 1969 and 1971, Pininfarina designed a total of three vehicles on two 33 Stradale chassis:

Alfa Romeo P33 Roadster
The Alfa Romeo P33 Roadster of 1968 was an open vehicle with a lower windscreen and a striking, contrast-painted roll bar. The vehicle used in the chassis No. 750.33.108. It was presented to the public at the Turin Motor Show in November 1968. Its whereabouts are unclear. Possibly the body of the P 33 was removed after the public exhibition, and the chassis re-bodied two years later to produce the Cuneo.

Alfa Romeo 33/2 Coupé Speciale

The Alfa Romeo 33/2 Coupé Speciale of 1969, also known as Alfa Romeo 33.2, is a Pininfarina designed concept car, first presented at the Paris Motor Show in 1969.

This 2-door coupé was designed by Leonardo Fioravanti, then working at Pininfarina; the design was influenced by the Ferrari 250 P5 concept shown a year earlier at Geneva.
The 33.2 featured hydraulically working butterfly doors and pop-up headlights.

It is based on the 33 Stradale chassis No. 750.33.115. It bore a striking yellow paint.

Alfa Romeo P33 Cuneo
The Pininfarina Cuneo was an open, wedge-designed sports car that was presented at the Brussels Motor Show in January 1971 and probably also based on the chassis No. 750.33.108.

Italdesign

Alfa Romeo Iguana

Italdesign Giugiaro presented the Iguana at the Turin Motor Show in November 1969. It is a two-seater sports coupé built on chassis No. 750.33.116. The design showed some new elements, that Giugiaro introduced later in production vehicle designs. The body of the Iguana was painted a metal-flake grey, while the roof frame and cabin pillars were finished in brushed metal, a treatment Giugiaro later applied to the DMC DeLorean. The front end of the Iguana inspired Giugiaro in his designs for the Bora and Merak, and the rear end with the high-mounted tail lights informed the design of the Alfa Romeo Alfasud Sprint. Allegedly, a serial production of the Iguana was planned, but it never materialized.

See also
 Alfa Romeo Montreal
 Ferrari Dino
 Lancia Stratos

Notes

References

External links

German article of Stradale with chassis numbers
Brief story and original pictures about the 33 Stradale and five of the derived concepts

33 Stradale
Rear mid-engine, rear-wheel-drive vehicles
Sports cars
Coupés
1960s cars
Cars introduced in 1967